{{Speciesbox
| name = Hyloscirtus estevesi
| image = 
| status = DD | status_system = IUCN3.1
| taxon = Hyloscirtus estevesi
| authority = (Rivero, 1968)
| synonyms = |status_ref= }}Hyloscirtus estevesi'' is a species of frog in the family Hylidae endemic to Venezuela.
Its natural habitats are rivers.

References

Hyloscirtus
Amphibians described in 1968
Taxonomy articles created by Polbot